Roger Gyselinck (17 September 1920 – 5 January 2002) was a Belgian racing cyclist. He raced in the 1947 Tour de France and finished in tenth place in the 1948 Paris–Roubaix.

References

External links

1920 births
2002 deaths
Belgian male cyclists
People from Wetteren
Cyclists from East Flanders
20th-century Belgian people